Le Monteil-au-Vicomte is a commune in the Creuse department in the Nouvelle-Aquitaine region in central France.

Geography
The commune is within the boundaries of the natural park of the Millevaches (1000 lakes, not cows).

Population

Sights
 The thirteenth-century church at Le Monteil.
 The thirteenth-century church at Chatain.
 A ruined castle donjon, dating from the twelfth century.

Personalities
Pierre d'Aubusson (1423 - 30 June 1503), Grand Master of the order of St. John of Jerusalem (the Knights Hospitaller) was born at the castle.

See also
Communes of the Creuse department

References

Communes of Creuse